Kate Boy are a Swedish synthpop duo from Stockholm. The group was founded by Kate Akhurst, from Australia, and Markus Dextegen, from Sweden, together with former swedish members Hampus Nordgren Hemlin and Oskar Sikow. All members have participated in writing, producing and playing instruments. They released their debut studio album, One, in November 2015.

Discography

Studio albums
 One (2015)

Extended plays
 Kate Boy (2015)
 The Remix EP (2015)

Singles
 "Northern Lights" (2012)
 "The Way We Are" (2013)
 "Self Control" (2014)
 "Open Fire" (2014)
 "Midnight Sun" (2015)
 "True Colours" (2017)
 "Dopamin" (2018)
 “Giants” (2018)

Music videos
 "Northern Lights" (2012)
 "In Your Eyes" (2013)
 "The Way We Are" (2013)
 "Midnight Sun" (2015)
 "True Colours" (2017)

Remixes
 Tove Lo – "Timebomb" (2015)

References

External links
 Kate Boy on Spotify
 Kate Boy on Soundcloud
 Kate Boy YouTube channel
 

2012 establishments in Sweden
Electronic music duos
Fiction Records artists
Musical groups established in 2012
Musical groups from Stockholm
Swedish musical duos
Swedish synthpop groups
Iamsound Records artists